The Rage: Carrie 2 is a 1999 American supernatural horror film directed by Katt Shea, and starring Emily Bergl, Jason London, Dylan Bruno, J. Smith-Cameron and Amy Irving. The film is a sequel to the 1976 horror film Carrie based on the 1974 novel of the same name by Stephen King, and serves as the second film in the Carrie franchise. Its plot follows the younger half-sister of Carrie White (Bergl), also suffering with telekinesis, who finds that her best friend's suicide was spurred by a group of popular male classmates who exploited her for sexual gain.

The Rage: Carrie 2 was released on March 12, 1999, and was a box office bomb at the time of release, grossing $17 million against a $21 million production budget. It received generally negative reviews from critics, who criticized the film's failure to capture the essence of what made the original "believably" creepy. In spite of this, the performances of the cast were praised—especially that of Bergl, who was nominated for a Saturn Award—and it has obtained a cult following.

Plot 
In 1986, as a child, Rachel Lang is placed in foster care when her mother, Barbara, is diagnosed with schizophrenia after mistaking signs of Rachel's telekinesis for demonic possession. Thirteen years later, in September 1999, Rachel, an outcast, is living with unsympathetic foster parents and attending high school. After her best friend, Lisa Parker, commits suicide by leaping from the roof of the school, it is uncovered that Eric Stark, a popular football star, rejected her after exploiting her for sex.

A devastated Rachel finds a photo of Lisa and Eric kissing while developing rolls of Lisa's film at a photo lab where she works. Rachel turns the photograph in to police, and explains that Lisa had confessed to her that she had recently lost her virginity. Sheriff Kelton, along with the school's guidance counselor, Sue Snell, pursue statutory rape charges against Eric, who is over eighteen. It is uncovered that Eric and his football player peers, including Mark Bing and Chuck Potter, are competing to see who could seduce the most girls by the end of the year.

Late one night while driving home, Jesse Ryan, another player on the football team, is flagged down by Rachel after her Basset Hound, Walter, is hit by a car on the road. Jesse, who is not as callous as his peers, takes a genuine interest in Rachel, at the behest of cheerleader Tracy Campbell, who is pursuing him. Meanwhile, having discovered that Rachel implicated them in Lisa's death, Eric and Mark attempt to scare her into silence by harassing her at her home, but her unusually strong telekinetic powers frighten them away.

Meanwhile, Sue gradually begins to suspect Rachel may possess telekinetic powers through their counseling sessions. She tracks down Rachel's institutionalized mother, Barbara, whose schizophrenia has stabilized, and Barbara confesses that Rachel's father was Ralph White, the father of Carrie White. Sue subsequently brings Rachel to the ruins of the former high school that she attended, which Carrie destroyed in a telekinetic rage in 1976 after being humiliated at her senior prom. Sue, a peer of Carrie's, was one of the few survivors of the incident. When Sue discloses that Carrie is Rachel's half-sister, Rachel dismisses her as a liar.

Later, the district attorney covers up the statutory rape charges against Eric because the players' families have political influence. Mark retaliates against Rachel by setting up a romantic getaway for her and Jesse, which he covertly films unbeknownst to them. Monica Jones, the girlfriend of Mark's friend Brad Winters, then befriends Rachel under false pretenses, inviting her to a party after a football game. Rachel leaves with Monica to the party, while Jesse is forced to ride with Tracy after his car's tires are slashed. Tracy stops at her house first and unsuccessfully attempts to seduce him. Meanwhile, Sue manages to sneak Barbara out of the institution so that she can confess Rachel's father's identity to her.

At the party, Mark and Chuck soon confront Rachel, revealing their sex game and falsely claiming that Rachel was added to Jesse's list of girls he has bedded. They also project the footage of her and Jesse having sex for all of the partygoers to see. This triggers Rachel's telekinesis, and she seals the house closed. She kills most of the partygoers by causing a large glass window to explode, slashing them to death, and also triggers a fire. Meanwhile, Sue and Barbara track Rachel to the party, but a fire-poker impales the front door, killing Sue. As Rachel pursues Monica, Eric, and Mark through the house, they arm themselves with weapons. Rachel kills Monica by causing her glasses to implode into her eyes, causing Monica to inadvertently castrate Eric with a harpoon. Mark shoots her with a flare gun and Rachel falls into the swimming pool. When Mark goes over to inspect whether she is dead, Rachel appears out of the water and pulls Mark into the pool. Rachel triggers the sensor to the automatic pool cover, and manages to free herself while Mark drowns.

Barbara confronts an injured Rachel and initially attempts to comfort her, but proceeds to accuse her of being possessed, and flees. Jesse and Tracy arrive moments later, and Rachel kills Tracy by causing a piece of ceiling to collapse on her. On a balcony, Rachel confronts Jesse about his supposed list, but he denies it. Rachel then notices that the videotape of her and Jesse, still playing in the living room, captured Jesse saying "I love you" while she slept, and immediately realizes that Jesse's feelings for her are indeed genuine. Moments later, an awning collapses on Rachel, and with Jesse unable to free her, she uses her telekinesis to throw him over the balcony onto the pool cover as she burns to death.

One year later in 2000, Jesse, now studying at King's University, shares a dormitory with Rachel's dog Walter. He has a vision of Rachel appearing in his room, and they kiss before she shatters into pieces. He panickedly awakens, realizing the vision was only a nightmare.

Cast 

 Emily Bergl as Rachel Lang
 Kayla Campbell as Young Rachel
 Jason London as Jesse Ryan: a popular jock with whom Rachel falls in love.
 Dylan Bruno as Mark Bing: a football player who owns the mansion where the football game after-party takes place.
 J. Smith-Cameron as Barbara Lang: Rachel's biological mother.
 Amy Irving as Sue Snell: the sole survivor of Carrie's rage in the original film, now a guidance counselor.
 Zachery Ty Bryan as Eric Stark: a jock who seduces and then humiliates Lisa, resulting in her suicide.
 John Doe as Boyd: Rachel's foster father
 Charlotte Ayanna as Tracy Campbell: Jesse Ryan's ex-girlfriend, a popular cheerleader.
 Rachel Blanchard as Monica Jones: Tracy's best friend.
 Justin Urich as Brad Winters: football player and Monica's boyfriend.
 Mena Suvari as Lisa Parker: Rachel's best friend, who commits suicide.
 Elijah Craig as Chuck Potter: football player.
 Eddie Kaye Thomas as Arnold: Rachel's friend.
 Clint Jordan as Sheriff Kelton
 Kate Skinner as Emilyn: Rachel's foster mother 
 Gordon Clapp as Mr. Stark: Eric's father
 Steven Ford as Coach Walsh
 Deborah Meschan as Deborah: One of Monica's friends who takes part in setting Rachel up
 Katt Shea as Deputy D.A.
 Robert D.Raiford as The Senior D.A.
 Rhoda Griffis as Mrs. Porter: A Saleswoman
 Sissy Spacek as Carrie White via archival flashbacks: Rachel's deceased half-sister, and the protagonist of the original film. Sissy Spacek turned down an offer to cameo in the film but gave permission to have her scenes used in the form of flashbacks.

Production

Development 
Originally titled The Curse, the film was initially scheduled to start production in 1996 with Emily Bergl in the lead, however production stalled for two years. The plot heavily borrows from a real-life 1993 incident in which a group of high school jocks known as the Spur Posse were involved in a sex scandal. The film eventually went into production in 1998 under the title Carrie 2: Say You're Sorry. A few weeks into production, director Robert Mandel quit over creative differences and Katt Shea hurriedly took over the reins with less than a week to prepare to start filming, and two weeks' worth of footage to reshoot.

Casting 
Amy Irving reprised the role of Sue Snell, which she originated in the first Carrie, though she was initially wary of taking the role and asked Brian De Palma, director of the original film, for his blessing. Director Shea was told that she would not be able to use footage of Sissy Spacek from the original Carrie, but she edited several scenes into the film and presented the film to Spacek, who granted permission for her likeness to be used.

Release

Box office 
The Rage: Carrie 2, was released on March 12, 1999. It opened in second place that weekend but was not successful. It grossed a total of $17,762,705 domestically against a $21 million budget, making the film a box office disappointment.

Home media 
The film was released on VHS and DVD on October 12, 1999 and Laserdisc on November 9. A Blu-ray version of the film was released on April 14, 2015 in a double feature with the 2002 TV version of Carrie from Scream Factory. This edition went out of print in October 2019.

Reception

Critical response 
The film received mostly negative reviews upon its release. Rotten Tomatoes reported the film had a 23% approval rating based on 39 reviews with the consensus: "As disposable as its predecessor is indispensable, The Rage: Carrie 2 mimics the arc of Stephen King's classic story without adding anything of value". On Metacritic it had a rating of 42 on a scale from 0–100 based on 21 reviews indicating mixed or average reviews.

Roger Ebert gave the film two out of four stars: "The original Carrie worked because it was a skillful teenage drama grafted onto a horror ending. Also, of course, because De Palma and his star, Sissy Spacek, made the story convincing. The Rage: Carrie 2 is more like a shadow". Anita Gates of The New York Times characterized it as "typical B-movie making. The actors are attractive and do credible jobs, and in the tradition of the original film, there's one really good scare at the end". Dennis Harvey of Variety panned the film, noting that it "uses the original as a blueprint, but leaves out all the wit, sympathy and bravado".

Ty Burr of Entertainment Weekly gave the film a more favorable B-minus rating, praising Bergl's performance and summarizing that the film is "better than it deserves to be". Kevin Thomas of the Los Angeles Times championed the film as a "well-directed sequel" that "accepts the telekinetic gimmick as an obligatory plot device [to] rage against high school machismo".

Soundtrack 

The accompanying soundtrack album was released on March 23, 1999 by Edel Records.

Track listing

References

External links 

 
 
 

1999 films
1999 horror films
1990s high school films
1990s supernatural films
1990s teen horror films
American high school films
American sequel films
American supernatural horror films
American teen horror films
Carrie (franchise)
Films about bullying
American films about revenge
Films about virginity
Films set in 1986
Films set in 1999
Films set in 2000
Films set in Maine
Films shot in North Carolina
Films shot in South Carolina
Films about rape
Films about telekinesis
United Artists films
Metro-Goldwyn-Mayer films
Films directed by Katt Shea
1990s supernatural horror films
Films about mass murder
1990s English-language films
1990s American films